Red Sulphur Springs may refer to:

Red Sulphur Springs, Tennessee
Red Sulphur Springs, West Virginia
Red Sulphur Springs Hotel